The 1963 Arizona Wildcats baseball team represented the University of Arizona in the 1963 NCAA University Division baseball season. The Wildcats played their home games at UA Field and Hi Corbett Field in Tucson, Arizona. The team was coached by Frank Sancet in his fourteenth season at Arizona.

The Wildcats reached the College World Series, finishing as the runner up to Southern California.

Roster

Schedule

References 

Arizona
Arizona Wildcats baseball seasons
College World Series seasons
Western Athletic Conference baseball champion seasons
1963 in sports in Arizona